Pinalia ovata is a species of orchid found from the Ryukyu Islands and Taiwan to the Philippines. It is an epiphyte that is found growing from 500 to 2,550 meters elevation. This species is erect and sympodial with pseudobulbs of 20 cm long by 1.2 cm diameter. It has about 4 leaves that are linear-oblong to oblong-lanceolate of 15 cm long and 2.1 cm wide.

References

ovata
Orchids of Japan
Orchids of the Philippines
Orchids of Taiwan
Flora of the Ryukyu Islands
Plants described in 1844